"Stomp" is a 1997 song by gospel group God's Property featuring Salt-N-Pepa rapper Cheryl James and Christian urban singer Kirk Franklin. One of the most successful gospel songs of the 1990s, "Stomp" charted on Billboard's mainstream R&B airplay list in 1997. The song samples "One Nation Under a Groove" by Funkadelic.

Official remixes
Official dance remixes by London DJ Booker T were released on vinyl and were included on the European CD single release of "You Are the Only One". 
"Stomp (Booker T R&B Flavor Mix)" (6:12)
"Stomp (Booker T Spiritual House Mix)" (5:11)
"Stomp (Booker T Spiritual Property Mix)" (6:28)

Chart performance
Radio & Records pop chart – No.34
ARC Weekly Top 40 – No.20

References

1997 singles
1996 songs
Interscope Records singles
Songs written by George Clinton (funk musician)
Songs written by Garry Shider